Kuman Nurmakhanuly Tastanbekov (Qūman Nūrmahanūly Tastanbekov; 10 March 1945 Kazakh USSR Almaty Region Sarkand District - 17 December 2017 Kazakhstan Almaty) was a Kazakh actor. He was the holder of the Lenin Komsomol Prize in Kazakhstan (1976). He worked for the Kazakh State Academic Drama Theater since 1969.

Early career 

Filmography 
His first role was Tolegen in the movie Kyz Zhibek. Then

Winter – Anxious Season
My brother is mine
Special day
Swans fly
The Echo of Love"
Bride on the bride
When the Goose Returns November
Provincial Story
End of the platform
Expression
She is on stage
 Kassym, Kulbek (Ch. Aitmatov "Mother – Earth – Mother" and "White Ship")
 Alibek, Narsha, Abyz (M.Auezov, Aiman-Sholpan, Karaagoz and Enlik-Kebek)
Tanirbergen (A. Nurpeisov, "The blood and the throat")
Jean (O. Bokeev, "My Soul", Kazakhstan's Lenin Komsomol Prize, 1976)
Aidar (Auezov and LS Sobolev, "Abai")
Mazdak (M. Shakhanov, "The Kingdom of Faith")
Orest (L. Durock, "Electra, My Sweetheart")
Floridore (F.Erve, "Fox Violet")
Farkhad (Nazim Hikmet, "Farkhad – Shirin"), etc. as well as performing various roles and behaviors.

Awards 
 1976 Laureate of the Lenin Komsomol Prize in Kazakhstan
 1982 Honored Artist of Kazakhstan, Honored Artist of the Kazakh SSR
 1993 People's Artist of the Republic of Kazakhstan
 2001 10 years of Independence of the Republic of Kazakhstan
 2008, Order of Kurmet
 2015 20 years to the Constitution of the Republic of Kazakhstan
 2016 Parasat's Order 
 2016 25 years of Independence of Kazakhstan"

References

1945 births
2017 deaths
Kazakhstani male actors
Recipients of the Order of Parasat